Dr. William Pollin (May 13, 1922 - January 25, 2008) was a psychiatrist who served as the second director of the National Institute on Drug Abuse and as a staff member of the National Institute of Mental Health. He is best remembered as the person who "declared cigarette smoking was more addictive than alcohol or heroin."

Early life 

Pollin was born in Philadelphia, Pennsylvania and served as a merchant marine during World War II. Following the war, he attended and graduated from the City College of New York before attending Columbia University. He graduated from Columbia's medical school in 1952.

Career 

NIDA Director Nora Volkow summarized Dr. Pollin's contributions to psychiatry and to drug control policy as follows:
At NIMH he contributed to early studies which examined pairs of twins to determine the connection between development of schizophrenia and obstetrical complications and various other neurological abnormalities. At NIDA he was one of the key researchers who changed the medical view of tobacco smoking from an unhealthy habit to a diagnosable drug addiction—after which cigarette makers nicknamed him "Doctor Death" to the tobacco industry. Dr. Pollin emphasized supporting family-oriented drug prevention programs and during this time the rate of cannabis abuse in high school children declined.

Personal life 

Pollin married his first wife, Marilyn, in 1951. She died in 1990. He remarried in 1993.

Death 

Pollin died of a heart attack at Suburban Hospital in Bethesda, Maryland. He was survived by his wife of 15 years, Teresa Pollin, as well as his two children from his first marriage; his stepson; and seven grandchildren.

References

External links 

"Why People Smoke Cigarettes", a statement on cigarette smoking developed from testimony delivered before the U.S. Congress by William Pollin, M.D., Director of the National Institute on Drug Abuse on March 16, 1982 (DHHS, 1983).

American psychiatrists
Health effects of tobacco
2008 deaths
1922 births
United States Merchant Mariners of World War II
City College of New York alumni
Columbia University alumni